The Singing Sheriff is a 1944 American Western comedy film directed by Leslie Goodwins and written by Henry Blankfort and Eugene Conrad. The film stars Bob Crosby, Fay McKenzie, Fuzzy Knight, Iris Adrian, Samuel S. Hinds, Edward Norris, Andrew Tombes and Joe Sawyer. The film was released on October 6, 1944, by Universal Pictures.

Plot

Cast        
Bob Crosby as Bob Richards
Fay McKenzie as Caroline
Fuzzy Knight as Fuzzy
Iris Adrian as Lefty
Samuel S. Hinds as Seth
Edward Norris as Vance
Andrew Tombes as Jonas
Joe Sawyer as Squint
Walter Sande as Butch
Doodles Weaver as Ivory
Pat Starling as Showgirl
Louis DaPron as Louis 
Spade Cooley as himself

References

External links
 

1944 films
American Western (genre) comedy films
1940s Western (genre) comedy films
Universal Pictures films
Films directed by Leslie Goodwins
American black-and-white films
1944 comedy films
1940s English-language films
1940s American films